London Coffee House, commonly referred to as the Old London Coffee House, was a colonial-era coffee house in Philadelphia, Pennsylvania, that stood on the southwest corner of Market Street (formerly High Street) and Front Street. It was the scene of political and commercial activity, and also served as a place to inspect black slaves recently arrived from Africa and to bid for their purchase at public auction.

History
Opened by William Bradford in 1754, the London Coffee House was built with funds provided by more than 200 Philadelphia merchants, and it soon became their meeting place. Here merchants, ship masters and others talked business and made deals that they often sealed with nothing more than a simple handshake. The governor of Pennsylvania and other colonial officials also frequented the coffee house, where they held court in their own private booths.

It was named the London coffee house, the second house in Philadelphia to bear that title. The building had stood since 1702, when Charles Reed, later mayor of the city, put it up on land which he bought from Letitia Penn, daughter of William Penn. Bradford was the first to use the structure for coffee-house purposes. 

The London Coffee House was situated at the once-busy corner of Front street and High (now Market) Streets hard on the city's docks. Many real estate lots were offered over pots of coffee.

Shuttered in the aftermath of the British occupation of Philadelphia in 1778, the London Coffee House did not re-open until 1783. But the 1780s were a difficult time in which to establish or revive a business in the city. Unable to weather the economic hardship, the London Coffee House was in 1791 converted into a residence and general store.

The London Coffee House building was demolished in 1883.

References

External links

 Old London Coffee House Historical Marker

Culture of Philadelphia
History of Philadelphia
1754 establishments in Pennsylvania
Commercial buildings completed in 1754
African slave trade
Slavery in the United States
Taverns in Pennsylvania